Daniel Kenneth Doran (April 25, 1966 - February 13, 2017) was an American former competitive figure skater. He won gold at the 1985 Karl Schäfer Memorial and 1986 St. Ivel International, two Skate America medals, and two U.S. national medals. He placed in the top ten at the 1986 and 1989 World Championships. He was raised in Oak Lawn, Illinois.

Competitive highlights 

1960s births
American male single skaters
Living people
People from Oak Lawn, Illinois